tRNA wybutosine-synthesizing protein 2 homolog is a protein that in humans is encoded by the TRMT12 gene.

References

Further reading